Gamboma is a town located in the Plateaux Region of the Republic of the Congo. It is served by Gamboma Airport.

References

Plateaux Department (Republic of the Congo)
Populated places in the Republic of the Congo